II Corps is a corps of the Indian Army, based in Ambala and known as Kharga Corps.

The Corps was raised on October 7, 1971 by Lt Gen T N Raina at Krishna Nagar in West Bengal and saw action two months later in December. During the Indo-Pakistani War of 1971, it captured the important towns of Khulna, Jessore, Jhenida, Magura and Faridpur and also the area between the rivers Ganges and Padma. Subsequently, the Corps was shifted to the Western Theatre where it was initially located at Chandimandir Cantonment till 1984, and then moved to Ambala in January 1985.

Indo-Pakistani War of 1971
The II Corps consisted of 4th Mountain Division and 9th Infantry Division (the only infantry division in the east, it had more motor vehicles and heavier artillery than its mountain counterparts); the corps was later reinforced by 50 Parachute Brigade (minus one battalion). Under Lieutenant General Tapishwar Narain Raina ('Tappy'), the 20 infantry battalions of II Corps were to take Khulna, Jessore, Goalundo Ghat, Faridpur, and the Hardinge Bridge. Convinced that Khulna was one of the keys to East Pakistan, General Manekshaw placed especial stress on its capture. Dacca was not mentioned except in some contingency plans for crossing the Padma (Ganges) at Faridpur and Goalundo Ghat. Paying little attention to possible operations against the chief city of East Pakistan, therefore, Raina planned to advance on two axes with 4th Division in the north towards Jhenida and 9th Division aiming for Jessore on the southern approach.

Operations by Indian troops and Mukti Bahini during late November had secured a sizable
enclave between Bayra and Jessore. An Indian success at Garibpur on 21/22 November was
particularly significant, as it allowed the Indian 9th Division to gain considerable ground towards Jessore and resulted in the virtual destruction of the lone Pakistani armored squadron in the area. The action at Garibpur, however, also alerted the Pakistanis to the 9th Division’s proposed line of advance. As a result, the division quickly became embroiled in a tough and costly slogging match on 4 and 5 December once the full-scale conflict broke out. This fight took its toll on the Pakistanis too, however, and the exhausted 107 Brigade abandoned Jessore on the night of 6/7 December, withdrawing south to Khulna in considerable confusion.47

The Pakistani division headquarters and other remnants fled east toward the Madhumati River. A Pakistani officer recalled that “The front here had crumbled completely...Withdrawal quickly turned into a rout.” Riding into Jessore in the dawn hours of 7 December, he noted, “It looked like a ghost town, except for sleepy dogs and chickens, not a soul stirred. Doors were wide open; all kinds of personal belongings littered the roads. It looked like the end of East Pakistan.”48 The Indians occupied Jessore later that day, but Major General Dalbir Singh, the 9th Division commander, allowed himself to be distracted by Khulna and turned his entire division toward an objective that was supposed to be taken by a brigade. The town held out stoutly for the remainder of the war in the face of repeated attacks.

The 9 Division’s reserve force, 50 Para Brigade, engaged in a brief skirmish at Khajura north of Jessore on 8 December before being pulled out the next day for transfer to the western front. A planned two-company airborne attack by 8 Para near Jhenida was called off as unnecessary. The “Red Eagles,” Indian 4 Division, launched a well-conducted attack north and east from its positions around Jibannagar, skillfully bypassing or overwhelming resistance to enter Jhenida on 7 December. Like 9 Division, however, the leadership of the 4th was distracted by a flank objective. In this case, when a hasty attempt to capture Kushtia and the Hardinge Bridge miscarried, the senior commanders overreacted and diverted the entire division to the north. Although the Indian advance helped urge Pakistan’s 57 Brigade in its retreat across the Ganges, by the time 4 Division had returned to the Magura area (14 December), it was too late to participate in the drive for Dacca. The division made a fine crossing of the Madhumati (albeit against light resistance) and took the surrender of the broken remnants of Pakistani 9 Division at Faridpur on 16 December. Indian Army and BSF troops from Bengal Area under Major General P. Chowdry made limited gains on the Satkhira axis.

Shift to West
The corps moved to its present location in January 1985. The pullback of over four lakh troops along with heavy armored and artillery formations from forward positions along the International Border (IB) with Pakistan was an enormous logistical exercise, with costs running into hundreds of crores of rupees. Demobilisation began from Punjab, followed by Rajasthan, Gujarat and the Jammu sector. While it took 28 days for the initial mobilisation, the pullback is expected to take slightly longer. The troops had been hanging on the border in combat readiness for 10 months, and the harsh weather and terrain took a heavy toll on both the men and their equipment.

As of around 2016, it consists of -
Divisions
1 Armoured Division (Airawat Division) headquartered at Patiala. 1 Division had 1 Armoured and 43 Lorry Brigade, a scheme it retained till after the 1971 War, when armoured divisions were changed to a three-brigade layout, and 43 Lorry Brigade became 43 Armoured Brigade.
14 Infantry Division (RAPID) (Golden Key Division) at Dehra Dun, Uttarakhand. Division Artillery Brigade is at Raiwala, 35 Infantry Brigade at Dehra Dun, 58 Armoured Brigade at Roorkee, and 116 Infantry Brigade at Dehra Dun.
22 Infantry Division (Charging Ram Division) headquartered at Meerut
40 Artillery Division (Deep Strikers Division) at Ambala
Corps Brigades
2 Corps Artillery Brigade
474 Engineering Brigade
Independent Brigades
612 Mechanised Independent Air Defence Brigade at Ambala
16 Independent Armoured Brigade (Black Arrow Brigade) at Mamun

List of General Officers Commanding (GOCs)

References

002
Military units and formations established in 1971
1971 establishments in India
Corps of India in World War I